Shahrak (also known as Shāhrek and Sharak) is a village in Saidabad Rural District, in the Central District of Ijrud County, Zanjan Province, Iran. At the 2006 census, its population was 1,179, in 340 families.

References 

Populated places in Ijrud County